Against the Wind is a 1990 Spanish incest-themed drama film written and directed by Paco Periñán which stars Antonio Banderas and Emma Suárez.

Plot 
The plot tracks the resumption of the sibling incest held between Juan and his sister Ana, once Juan, living in a small village in Andalusia, faces Ana's arrival to town, thus putting aside his budding relationship with Rosario, a local woman.

Cast

Production 

The film is a Creativos Asociados de Radio y Televisión (CARTEL) production. Shooting locations included , Playa de Mónsul, and Níjar.

Release 
Selected for the 38th San Sebastián International Film Festival's official selection, the film was presented on 24 September 1990. It was theatrically released on 12 October 1990.

Reception 
Ángel Fernández-Santos of El País cited the circumstance that "there is no sufficiently powerful image in the film, no situation from which it can be unequivocally deduced that when this couple [Banderas and Suárez] makes love they are violating the ancestral taboo of consanguinity" as a negative point, also pointing out that the writing resents from some loose threads that the director is not able to fully rectify later in the transfer to a visual language.

Accolades 

|-
| rowspan = "2" align = "center" | 1991 || rowspan = "2" | 5th Goya Awards || Best New Director || Paco Periñán ||  || rowspan = "2" | 
|-
| Best Supporting Actress || Rosario Flores || 
|}

See also 
 List of Spanish films of 1990

References 

Films shot in the province of Almería
1990 drama films
1990s Spanish-language films
Spanish romantic drama films
Films set in Andalusia
Incest in film
1990s Spanish films